Ronny Hebestreit (born 9 January 1975 in Gotha) is a German football coach and former footballer. He is currently working as assistant manager of  FC Rot-Weiß Erfurt.

Hebestreit scored 113 goals in 329 appearances for Rot-Weiß Erfurt, over two spells, making him the club's second top goalscorer of all time, behind Jürgen Heun. He has also played for Hallescher FC, ZFC Meuselwitz and Bayern Munich II.

References

External links
 

1975 births
Living people
German footballers
Association football midfielders
Association football forwards
FC Rot-Weiß Erfurt players
FC Bayern Munich II players
Hallescher FC players
2. Bundesliga players
People from Gotha (town)
Footballers from Thuringia